High Tor State Park is a  state park on the north edge of the Town of Clarkstown in Rockland County, New York, United States. The park is located on South Mountain, which has two peaks, High Tor and Little Tor.

Park description
High Tor State Park is intended for day use during the summer months, and contains picnic tables, a pool and showers, hiking trails, and a food concession.  The Long Path passes through the park.

They are the highest peaks in not only the park, but in all of the Hudson Palisades. The skyline of New York City can be seen from the summit of High Tor.

High Tor was used as a signal point during the American Revolution for the colonists, and was used as an air raid watch during World War II. Famous composer Kurt Weill worked as an air raid warden there.

See also
 High Tor, a 1936 play by Maxwell Anderson that focuses on the summit within the park
 List of New York state parks

References

External links
 New York State Parks: High Tor State Park
 NY-NJTC: High Tor State Park
 Palisades Parks Conservancy: High Tor State Park
 NY-NJ-CT Botany Online: Facts about High Tor

Palisades Interstate Park system
Parks in Rockland County, New York
State parks of New York (state)
Protected areas established in 1943
1943 establishments in New York (state)